Ruth Emily Gillmore (26 October 1899 - 12 February 1976) was an English-born American stage actress.

Early years 
Gillmore was the daughter of Frank Gillmore, former president of Actors' Equity, and actress Laura MacGillivray and the sister of actress Margalo Gillmore. Her great-aunt was the British actor-manager Sarah Thorne, and her great-uncles were the actors Thomas Thorne and George Thorne. She was a fourth-generation actor on her father's side,

Career 
Gillmore's first professional appearance was as an unborn child in Maurice Maeterlinck's The Betrothal in New York City in 1918. Her later theatrical appearances included Edie Upton in The Robbery (1921), Jeanne in The Nest (1922), The '49ers (1922), [[Algonquin Round Table#No_Sir>ree.21|No Sirree!]] (1922), Gail Carlton in No More Frontiers (1931), and Mrs Howard in The Farmer Takes a Wife (1934-5).

She married theatre producer Max Sonino in Florence in Italy. They met when he produced the 1931 play No More Frontiers, in which she had appeared. Together they translated the Italian plays Finding Oneself (1933) by Luigi Pirandello, and Giovacchino Forzano's Gutlibi and The Bells of San Lucio. Their daughter was Mildred Sonino.

Gillmore taught speech and drama at the Buckley School.

Personal life and death 
With her sister Margalo Gillmore she was a member of the Algonquin Round Table.

Gillmore died in Nantucket, Massachusetts, on February 12, 1976, aged 76.

References

1899 births
1976 deaths
Actresses from London
American stage actresses
British emigrants to the United States
Actresses from New York City
20th-century American actresses
Algonquin Round Table
20th-century English women
20th-century English people